is a Japanese tokusatsu series that aired from October 1, 2006 to December 24, 2006 in Japan, lasting 13 episodes. It is the third part in the Lion-Maru trilogy, following Kaiketsu Lion-Maru and Fuun Lion-Maru. The "G" is short for 'Ghetto'.

This Lion-Maru is called "the Beast Transformed Gigolo Warrior".

Story
The story is set in the year 2011 in Neo-Kabukichō, a fictitious version of the real red-light district of Shinjuku, Tokyo. A wave of violent crime is being caused by a new contact lens drug called "Skull Eyes", enabling people to become superhumans called Kabukimono. It follows the story of the reincarnated Lion-Maru and Tiger Joe from the original Kaiketsu Lion-Maru.

Characters
 A happy-go-lucky guy who is both a cowardly louse and a girl crazy gigolo, working at the Dreamin' night club. However, Shishimaru is in a slump from being the worst host to owing 30,000 Yen to Junior. While forced as Swankee bait pay a bit of his debt to Junior, Shishimaru finds out he is a reincarnation of the original , unsheathing the katana  to take on the power. He owns a modified Suzuki Burgman that he calls "Hikarimaru," the name of the Pegasus ridden by Lion-Maru in Kaiketsu Lion-Maru. Soon after Gosan's destruction, the experience from the events in the final battle changing him into a more serious man, Shishimaru disappears and becomes an urban legend.

 A freelance thug for Gousan who is the reincarnation of the original , called "Joe" for short. Though he sees Shishimaru as a rival, he is flustered that he is coward. He acts cold towards other people because his family members were murdered when he was at a young age. However, after being kissed by Saori, Jonosuke begins to warm up. He transforms with the mysterious sword . He remains very loyal to only Gousan, who took him in after the loss of his family, until Kashinkoji reveals that it was Gousan who was behind his parents' demise. In the end, losing his virginity to Saori prior, Jonosuke sacrificed himself to destroy Gousan.

 Saori is a busty mizu shobai girl who works in Neo-Kabukichō and also owes Junior money because of her host addiction, forced to work with Shishimaru during the Swankees incident. She is very similar to the original Saori, helping the current Lionmaru while falling in love with Jonosuke. In the series finale, Saori retired from her job to become a nun while bearing Jonosuke's child.

 Her real name being Kaori and going by a pen name as a journalist at Neo-Kabukicho magazine, Kosu K is a 14-year-old girl and Saori's younger sister. Though she didn't believe it at first, she ends up being thrust into Shishimaru's misadventure. In the end, she wrote all the events into a novel.

 Kashinkoji is an old homeless man who gives Kinsachi to Shishimaru. He is very knowledgeable about Lionmaru. He and Gousan seem to have known each other from long ago. Kashinkoji acts from the shadows until the final battle is about to begin, mortally wounded by Liontiger to steal back Kinsachi and Ginsachi and later saving Saori from the Shadows. Finding Gousan, Kashikoji battles him before being fatally wounded. Making his way to Shishimaru and Jonosuke, he tells them to join forces before he dies.

 His real name unknown, Junior is the Junior CEO of Gousan Enterprises, to which Shishimaru and Saori owe money. He is the son of Gousan, wearing hardcore cosplay outfits he made himself to receive his father's attention on him instead of Jonosuke and Shishimaru. This inferiority complex leads him to convince Saori to steal Kinsachi. But when Makage interferes, Junior loses it and confronts his father before attempting to kill him. However, it ends with Gosan killing him.

 Gousan is the boss of Gousan Enterprises, wearing a cap to conceal his rainbow-pupilled third eye. He creates the Skull Eyes, using the residents of NeoKabukicho to perfect his mind control Akaao contact lens before sending them across the country in a scheme to take it over. He seems to know a lot about Kinsachi and Ginsachi, and desires to gain possession of the mysterious swords. When Shishimaru and Jonosuke leave town, Gousan arranges his forces to kill everyone dear to Shishimaru. Eventually, despite overpowering them, Gousan is destroyed in Joe's suicide attack.

Shadows Gousan's ninja minions.

 An agent of Gousan who is sent to kill Shishimaru and Jonosuke and steal both Kinsachi and Ginsachi. Infiltrating Dreamin' and given the host name , Makage keeps an eye on Shishimaru. After beating Jonosuke to a blooding pulp to get Ginsachi, Makage uses it and the stolen Kinsachi to become . Though he manages to mortally would Kashinkoji, Makage is unable to endure the combined powers of the blades.

 He is a master of Snack Z, rarely talking and knows what's going on in Neo-Kabukicho and was Yuri's mentor. He ends up dying while fighting off the Shadows.
Ozaki Kaori's teacher, though he acts weird. He gets kills by the Shadows.
Animaru The owner of Dreamin' who took Shishimaru in out of pity. Though he survived an attempt on his life by the Shadows, he is not lucky a second time
Ranmaru, Kyosuke, and Akira Shishimaru's coworkers at Dreamin'. They get killed by the Shadows.
Haruna and Haruka Sex-crazy customers who victimize Shishimaru with their creepy advances. They get killed by the Shadows.

 A Kabukimono baseball team who use sign language to communicate. Targeting gigolos and hookers, Junior uses Shishimaru and Saori as bait to have Jonosuke deal with them. But when Shishimaru becomes Lionmaru, Jonosuke hires them kill off him. After the Swankees tear Dreamin' apart to find him before kidnapping Saori and Kosu K to get him, the Swankees torture Shishimaru with a Bomb Ball-firing pitching machine. But once Shishimaru becomes Lionmaru, he single-handedly defeats them.
 A sadist in kung fu garb who is a former Gousan Enterprises member and loses his eye as a result after being manhandled by Jonosuke for embezzling. Desiring revenge as he resumes his Fake Skull Eye operation, Toppogi searches the user of Kinsachi to counter Gousan while having his men abduct Saori and Kaori with three other girls through a clothing store for slave trading. Once finding Shishimaru, Toppogi recruits him to be a hitman to take out Jonosuke. However, after Shishimaru runs off when he needs him, Toppogi resorts to using real Skull Eyes before Lionmaru intervenes and takes out his posse prior to killing him.
 A man with a cheap unbendable prosthetic after he lost his pinkie for stealing from his own gang. After conning Junior's men out of five hundred pairs of Skull Eyes, Youji sells them to some punks. Though he takes Saori hostage, Youji ends up being captured by Joe's men.
 An old friend of Jonosuke who was his partner in Gousan Enterprises due to her supernatural powers. She later quit Gosan Enterprises and became a detective at Yokohama. However, out of impulse, Yuri ends up attacking Kabukimono. Eventually, she battles Tiger Joe while Lionmaru defeats her posse, the fight ending with Yuri allowing herself to be killed. However, her life is spared as she fakes amnesia while declared officially dead.

Episodes

 
Some of these episode titles are puns on the songs of a Japanese rock band, Number Girl.

Cast
 Shishimaru - 
 Jonosuke - 
 Saori - 
 Kosu K - 
 Kashinkoji - 
 Junior - 
 Gousan - 
 Master - 
 Yuri - 
 Makage -

Music
Opening Theme
 by 
Closing Themes
 by angela (Episodes 1 & 2)
 by angela (Episodes 3-12)
"Kaze yo Hikari yo" by Akira Kushida (Episode 13)

External links
StarChild:ライオン丸G (Lion-Maru G's official website)

Tokusatsu television series
Television series set in 2011